Zhaxi Island (also Tashi Island) is a small island in the middle of Lake Basum Tso a green salt water lake approximately  east of Lhasa in the Tibet Autonomous Region of China.  There are many large stones on Zhaxi Island and each big stone is a symbol of a different  Bodhisattva.

See also 
Tashi Dor

Islands of Tibet
Lake islands of China